Draped Reclining Figure, 1952–53 is a bronze sculpture by Henry Moore, catalogued as "LH 336".

Casts
The sculpture was cast in an edition of four (or "3+1"; one being retained by the artist). The artist's copy was given to the Henry Moore Foundation and is on display in their sculpture garden around his old house at Perry Green, Hertfordshire.   Other copies in the edition are in the Hirshhorn Museum and Sculpture Garden in Washington, D.C., and the Museum Ludwig in Cologne, Germany.

Origin
The work was a precursor to later draped figures. According to the artist's foundation, it "successfully added the contours of natural forms as well as a distinct hint of classicism to the repose of his figures, yet preserved that sense of immutability conveyed by the Mexican Chacmool figures that had so profoundly influenced the younger artist."

See also
List of sculptures by Henry Moore
List of public art in Washington, D.C., Ward 2

References

1953 sculptures
Bronze sculptures in Germany
Bronze sculptures in the United Kingdom
Bronze sculptures in Washington, D.C.
Hirshhorn Museum and Sculpture Garden
Outdoor sculptures in Washington, D.C.
Sculptures by Henry Moore
Sculptures of the Smithsonian Institution
Sculptures of women in Germany
Sculptures of women in the United Kingdom
Sculptures of women in Washington, D.C.
Statues in Germany
Statues in the United Kingdom
Statues in Washington, D.C.